The Martin Johnson House, at 45 W. 400 South in Glenwood, Utah, was built in c.1880.  It was listed on the National Register of Historic Places in 1982.

Martin Johnson was born in Denmark in 1861, came to Utah with his parents in 1866, and probably built this house in preparation for his marriage;  he was married in 1884.

The house is a one-and-a-half-story adobe structure laid out in a modified pair-house plan.  It has Gothic Revival-style cross gable above the main entrance, though not symmetrically placed.  It has decorative details including Doric columns on its porch and scroll-cut bargeboards.

References

Pair-houses
Houses on the National Register of Historic Places in Utah
Gothic Revival architecture in Utah
Houses completed in 1880
Sevier County, Utah